New Hampshire Route 75 (abbreviated NH 75) is a  secondary east–west highway in Strafford County in southeastern New Hampshire. It runs from Farmington to Milton.

The western terminus of NH 75 is in Farmington at New Hampshire Route 11. The eastern terminus is in Milton at New Hampshire Route 125 just east of the Spaulding Turnpike.

Major junctions

References

External links

 New Hampshire State Route 75 on Flickr

075
Transportation in Strafford County, New Hampshire